The Bottle Imp is a 1917 silent fantasy film produced by Jesse Lasky and distributed through Paramount Pictures. It is taken from the Robert Louis Stevenson short story, "The Bottle Imp". The movie was directed by Marshall Neilan in Hawaii and stars Japanese actor Sessue Hayakawa.

Prints are held by George Eastman House and Cinematheque Francais, Paris.

Cast
Sessue Hayakawa – Lopaka
Lehua Waipahu – Kokua
H. Komshi – Keano
George Kuwa – Makale
Guy Oliver – Rollins
James Neill – A Priest
Margaret Loomis (uncredited)

References

External links

1917 films
American silent feature films
Films based on short fiction
Films directed by Marshall Neilan
Films based on works by Robert Louis Stevenson
American black-and-white films
American fantasy films
1910s fantasy films
Films shot in Hawaii
1910s American films